Eltonåsen is a village in Nannestad municipality, Norway. It is located in Holter in southern Nannestad, west of Løkenfeltet. Its population (2005) is 744.

References

Villages in Akershus
Nannestad